Ramkanali railway station serves Ramkanali, Gobag, and surrounding areas in Purulia  district in the Indian state of West Bengal. There is a freight line link to Par Beliya colliery.

The railway station
It was allotted the railway station code of RKI and is under the jurisdiction of Adra railway division of South Eastern Railway.

History
The Bengal Nagpur Railway main line from Nagpur to Asansol, on the Howrah–Delhi main line, was opened for goods traffic on 1 February 1891.

Electrification
The Tatanagar–Adra–Asansol section was electrified in the 1957–1962 period. The Asansol–Purulia sector was electrified in 1961–62. The freight link from Ramkanali to Chaurasi siding of Par Beliya colliery was electrified in 1963–64.

References

External links

 Trains at Ramkanali

Adra railway division
Railway stations in Purulia district
Railway stations in India opened in 1891
Railway junction stations in West Bengal